is a toll road in Nagasaki Prefecture. It is owned and operated by the West Nippon Expressway Company (NEXCO West Japan). The route is signed E96 under Ministry of Land, Infrastructure, Transport and Tourism's  "2016 Proposal for Realization of Expressway Numbering."

Junction list
The entire expressway is in Nagasaki Prefecture. TB - toll gate

Main Route

Shōwamachi Branch

Nishiyama Branch

See also

Japan National Route 34

References

External links
 West Nippon Expressway Company

Toll roads in Japan
Roads in Nagasaki Prefecture